The Dayton Family is an American hip hop group from Flint, Michigan, composed of Ira "Bootleg" Dorsey, Raheen "Shoestring" Peterson and Matt "Backstabba" Hinkle. Its name derives from Dayton Street, one of Flint's most crime-ridden streets.

Musical career

Early history (1993–2005)
In 1993, Ira Dorsey and Raheen Peterson met through their younger brothers. The two began writing together, under the names Bootleg and Shoestring, and created their first song, "Dope Dayton Ave". Rapper Matt Hinkle soon joined the duo under the name Backstabba. The group began working with local producer Steve Pitts and formed The Dayton Family, named after Dayton Avenue, one of the most crime-ridden streets in their hometown of Flint, Michigan. In between studio sessions, they performed at local clubs and quickly gain notoriety within Flint.

The Dayton Family recorded a 12-inch single and soon signed with Atlanta independent record label Po' Broke in 1995. That year, the group released their debut album What's on My Mind? and were featured on No Limits Down South Hustlers: Bouncin' and Swingin' compilation album, which got the trio recognition throughout Southern United States. After the album's release, Hinkle was imprisoned and replaced by Bootleg's younger brother Erick, who performed under the name Ghetto-E. Following a year of touring, the group left Po' Broke due to legal problems with the label's producer and signed with Russ Entertainment .

In 1996, they released their second album F.B.I., standing for Fuck Being Indicted, under Russ Entertainment/Relativity Records. The Dayton Family was plagued with various legal problems, including Ira being incarcerated soon after release of F.B.I., which hindered the amount of work the group released. In 1999, both Ira and Peterson released solo albums. Two years later, the group signed with Detroit rapper Esham's Gothom label and released solo albums. The next year, they released Welcome to the Dopehouse under Koch Records.

Stabilization (2005-2010)
After a three-year hiatus, the group was trimmed down to Ira and Peterson and they released Family Feud through Fast Life Records. The following year, The Dayton Family signed with U Be U Records and released Back on Dayton Ave. The duo added new member Jake the Flake later that same year and released Return to Dayton Ave. in October. Following Hinkle's release from prison, the group returned to their original lineup of Ira, Peterson, and Hinkle. In 2009, they released The Return: The Right to Remain Silent under DDA Records.

Hatchet House (2010-2011)
On July 14, 2010, The Dayton Family signed with Insane Clown Posse's subsidiary label Hatchet House. The group released the EP Psycho on February 1, 2011, and a music video was released for the song "Cocaine" on 28 March. Their seventh album, Charges of Indictment, was released on June 28. They most recently featured in the "Psychopathic Psypher" Part 1 & 2 (Bootleg in Part 1 and Shoestring in Part 2). The video for "The Psypher (Part 1 & 2)" was released on June 5, 2011.

Style and influences
The Dayton Family is known for their gritty lyrics concerning ghetto survival, struggle and poverty. AllMusic reviewer Jason Birchmeier describes The Dayton Family's musical style as "potent hardcore rap". He says that the group has "an idiosyncratic identity" and "a dark, grim mentality focused on modest survival rather than riches or fame". The group lists Run-DMC, Michael Jackson, LL Cool J, N.W.A, Geto Boys, Tupac Shakur, Notorious B.I.G., X-Clan, Spice 1, Esham, Natas and Public Enemy as influences.

Discography

Studio albums

Extended plays

Solo albums
Bootleg
1999: Death Before Dishonesty
2001: Hated By Many, Loved By Few
2005: The Product
2009: I Declare War
2016: Problems EP
2016: Street Related
2018: The Transplant
2019: 93ID
Ghetto E
2001: Ghetto Theater
Shoestring
1999: Representin' Till The World Ends
2001: Cross Addicted
2016: Fix My City
2017: Black Friday
2019: The Bake Up Boy
Jake the Flake
1992: Out 2 Get Rich EP
1996: Flint Thug Compilation
1998: Out 2 Get Rich: The Album
1998: & The Flint Thugs
1998: Streets Is All I Know
1999: Mr. Jakafella Volume 1
2009: Uncut Raw
2015: Legendary Mixtape (Hosted By Mike Epps)
2015: Game Is Meant To Be Sold (The Soundtrack)
2019: Gloves Off
2020: God Forgive Me

Guest appearances

References

External links

African-American musical groups
American hip hop groups
Hatchet House artists
Musical groups from Flint, Michigan
Musical groups established in 1993
Reel Life Productions artists
1993 establishments in Michigan
Gangsta rap groups
Horrorcore groups